An Ancient Observer is the 8th album by Tigran Hamasyan released 31 March 2017. Two of the tracks on the album are developments of traditional Armenian melodies and all tracks have influences from Armenian folk music. Tigran also draws inspiration from Jazz and Rock music, as well as the natural landscape of Mount Ararat. This was Tigran's second album on Nonesuch Records. The album is mostly solo piano, however, there is sparing use of electronics and vocals. Tigran considers his next release, the EP For Gyumri, to be a companion work to this album.

Track listing

References 

2017 albums
Nonesuch Records albums
Tigran Hamasyan albums